Gebhardt Georg Arendt (5 May 1925 – 28 May 2013) was a German actor, cabaret artist and comedian. He appeared in more than 100 films between 1956 and 2002. He was born in Danzig, Free City of Danzig (present-day Gdańsk, Poland) and died in Munich, Germany, aged 88 from Alzheimer's disease.

Partial filmography

 It Was Always So Nice With You (1954) - Peters Begleiter in Hafenbar (uncredited)
 The Model Husband (1956)
 The Doctor of Stalingrad (1958) - Lagerinsasse
 Das haut einen Seemann doch nicht um (1958)
 Der Sündenbock von Spatzenhausen (1958) - Leopold Lugauer
 Kleine Leute mal ganz groß (1958) - Alois Knopf
 Mikosch of the Secret Service (1959) - Major Claus Dieter Graf Schnackewitz
 Paprika (1959)
 Der Frosch mit der Maske (1959) - James
 A Summer You Will Never Forget (1959) - Ruprecht
 The Crimson Circle (1960) - Sgt. Haggett
 Schlagerparade 1960 (1960) - Dixi Dolant
 The Terrible People (1960) - Antony Edwards
 Gustav Adolf's Page (1960) - Anton Leublfing
 The Green Archer (1961) - Spike Holland
 Schlagerparade 1961 (1961) - Dixie Dolan
 The Dead Eyes of London (1961) - Sergeant / Inspektor S. "Sunny" Harvey
 The Forger of London (1961) - Nachbar Stone / Organist Miller
 Musik ist Trumpf (1961) - Manager Nicky
 The Strange Countess (1961) - Lord Selwyn 'Selly' Moron
 So liebt und küsst man in Tirol (1961) - Graf Hasso Steinbach
 The Puzzle of the Red Orchid (1962) - Parker
 The Door with Seven Locks (1962) - Kriminalassistent Holms
 Wenn die Musik spielt am Wörthersee (1962) - Eddy Kummer
 The Inn on the River (1962) - Barnaby
 Treasure of the Silver Lake (1962) - Lord Castlepool
The Curse of the Yellow Snake (1963) - Samuel Carter
 The Squeaker (1963) - Josua 'Jos' Harras
 The Black Abbot (1963) - Horatio W. Smith
 The Indian Scarf (1963) - Richard Maria Bonwit
 The Secret of the Black Widow (1963) - Fish
 Room 13 (1964) - Dr. Higgins
 The Curse of the Hidden Vault (1964) - Ferry Westlake
 Der Hexer (1964) - Archibald Finch
 Last of the Renegades (1964) - Lord Castlepool
 Traitor's Gate (1964) - Hector
 Neues vom Hexer (1965) - Archibald Finch
 The Sinister Monk (1965) - Smith
 The Fountain of Love (1966) - Alwin Knobbe
 Circus of Fear (1966) - Eddie
 The Hunchback of Soho (1966) - Reverend David
 Maigret and His Greatest Case (1966) - François Labas
 The Trygon Factor (1966) - Emil Clossen
 Spy Today, Die Tomorrow (1967) - Prof. Strahlmann
 Feuer frei auf Frankie (1967) - Kaiser
 Ich spreng' euch alle in die Luft (1968) - Sgt. Harry Colman
 The Valley of Death (1968) - Lord Castlepool
 Das Go-Go-Girl vom Blow-Up (1969) - Dr. Adler
 Help, I Love Twins (1969) - Mr. Brown
 The Sex Nest (1970) - Majordomus alias Paganini
  (1970) - Hausmeister Gustav
 When You're With Me (1970) - Tobby Kirsch
  (1970) - Amtsrat Ernst Springbock
 Who Laughs Last, Laughs Best (1971) - Archibald Krüglein
 Hilfe, die Verwandten kommen (1971)
 Kompanie der Knallköppe (1971) - Adam Kahlfuß
  (1972) - Moritz Morris
 Always Trouble with the Reverend (1972) - Punchen
 The Heath Is Green (1972) - Herr Locher
 Blue Blooms the Gentian (1973) - Dr. Überlein
 Old Barge, Young Love (1973) - Eugen Quandt
 Das Wandern ist Herrn Müllers Lust (1973) - Dr. Schön
 Unsere Tante ist das Letzte (1973) - Otto-Wilhelm Hirsekorn
 Opération Lady Marlène (1975) - Simson
 The Secret Carrier (1975) - Weisbach
 Lady Dracula (1977) - Eddie
 Himmel, Scheich und Wolkenbruch (1979) - Professor Ewald Ziebiz
 Keiner hat das Pferd geküsst (1980) - Eddi
  (1990) - Psychiatrist
  (1995) - Klapka
  (2000) - Eddi

References

External links

1925 births
2013 deaths
20th-century German male actors
German male film actors
German male television actors
German male comedians
Naturalized citizens of Germany
People from the Free City of Danzig
Deaths from dementia in Germany
Deaths from Alzheimer's disease